Silsako Lake (also known as Silsako Beel) is a wetland and lake located at the heart of the Guwahati city and surrounded by villages like Satgaon, Hengrabari and Mathgharia in Kamrup Metropolitan district of Assam. Guwahati Water Bodies (Preservation and Conservation) Act-2008  has specifically notified the Silsako Lake in the Schedule I to IV along with other six wetlands of Guwahati.

Etmyology
Silsako is the Assamese term for Stone Bridge. Beel means lake in Assamese language.

Area
Silsako lake has a length of approximately 5 km and an average width of 250 m.

See also
List of lakes of Assam

References

Lakes of Assam
Tourist attractions in Guwahati